Raúl Kamffer Cardoso (16 Abril 1929 – 19 May 1987) was a Mexican filmmaker. For his film Ora Sí ¡Tenemos Que Ganar! (1981), Kamffer earned the Ariel Award for Best Director and Best Picture.

Biography 
Raúl Kamffer studied film production in Italy, at the Centro Experimental de Cinematografía de Roma. Back in Mexico, he was part of the first generation of the Centro Universitario de Estudios Cinematográficos. In 1968, he shot his first short film Fiesta de muertos, followed the following year by his first feature film Mictlán o la casa de los que ya no son.

His 1978 film ¡Ora sí tenemos que ganar! won 4 Ariel Awards in 1982.

Filmography

References

External links
 

1929 births
1987 deaths
Ariel Award winners
Best Director Ariel Award winners
Film directors from Mexico City
Spanish-language film directors
20th-century Mexican screenwriters
20th-century Mexican male writers